Burns City is an unincorporated census-designated place in Perry Township, Martin County, in the U.S. state of Indiana.  The population was 117 at the 2010 census.

History
The town was founded as Keck's Church in 1849 by Christian Keck, an early settler. It became known as Kecksville circa 1852. The name was officially changed to Burns City on September 15, 1890. The present name was applied by a railroad engineer whose wife's maiden name was Burns.

A post office was established under the name Keck's Church in 1849, was renamed Burns City in 1890, and remained in operation until it was discontinued in 1957.

Geography

Demographics

References

Census-designated places in Martin County, Indiana
Census-designated places in Indiana